Dennis Hale (born  1944) is an American political scientist who is an associate professor of political science at Boston College.

Education and teaching
Hale has a B.A. from Oberlin College (1966), an M.A. from Brooklyn College (1969), and a Ph.D. from the City University of New York Graduate Center (1977).

He has taught at Boston College since 1978, and was the department chair for eight years (1989–97).

Writing and media
Hale has published essays on local government, American political thought, public administration, and the modern experience of citizenship. He has co-edited two volumes of essays by French political scientist Bertrand de Jouvenel, and is completing a book on democracy and the jury system. Hale's essays and reviews have appeared in the Political Science Quarterly, PS, Society, The Journal of Politics, Polity, APSR, State and Local Government Review, Administration and Society, The Political Science Reviewer, The Washington Post, and Newsday.

Hale is the editor of The United States Congress, Transaction Publishers, 1983, and co-edited The nature of politics:  Bertrand de Jouvenel, with Marc Landy, Transaction Publishers, 1992, and a number of other books.

He has often been quoted by the media on his areas of expertise, including by The Boston Globe, The New York Times, The Boston Phoenix, The New York Sun, The Christian Science Monitor, and The Concord Monitor.

Americans for Peace and Tolerance
He is a co-founder of Americans for Peace and Tolerance, along with Charles Jacobs and  Islamic scholar Sheikh Dr. Ahmed Subhy Mansour. It states its purpose as "promote peaceful coexistence in an ethnically diverse America by educating the American public about the need for a moderate political leadership that supports tolerance and core American values in communities across the nation."  The group is a primary critic of the $15.6 million mosque in Roxbury Crossing, which the group asserts is led by extremist leaders and contributors.

See also 

 List of Oberlin College and Conservatory people
 List of Boston College people

References

External links
Dennis Hale - Political Science Department - Boston College

Living people
Oberlin College alumni
Brooklyn College alumni
Boston College faculty
1944 births
Political science educators
Political science writers
American magazine writers
American political scientists
American magazine editors
Graduate Center, CUNY alumni